The tarella shrew (Crocidura tarella) is a species of mammal in the family Soricidae. It is found in Democratic Republic of the Congo and Uganda. Its natural habitats are subtropical or tropical moist lowland forest and montane forest.

References

Crocidura
Mammals described in 1915
Taxonomy articles created by Polbot